Pohjois-Pasila (Finnish), Norra Böle (Swedish) is a neighborhood of Helsinki, Finland.

Posti Group, the Finnish mail corporation, has its head office in Pohjois-Pasila.

The tracks north of the Ilmala railway station and the VR depot extend into Pohjois-Pasila.

References

Pasila

fi:Pasila#Pohjois-Pasila